Toluwani Obayan is a Nigerian screenwriter, best known for writing films like Ponzi, This Lady Called Life. She is also the author of the book titled Becoming A Spectacular Woman.

Filmography
Ponzi (2021)
This Lady Called Life (2020)

Awards and recognitions

References

External links

Living people
Year of birth missing (living people)
Nigerian screenwriters
Yoruba women writers
Nigerian women writers